Macrochilo is a genus of litter moths of the family Erebidae. The genus was erected by Jacob Hübner in 1825.

Species
 Macrochilo absorptalis Walker, 1859 – slant-lined owlet moth
 Macrochilo andaca (H. Druce, 1891)
 Macrochilo bivittata Grote, 1877 – two-striped owlet moth
 Macrochilo cribrumalis Hübner, 1793 – dotted fan-foot
 Macrochilo hypocritalis Ferguson, 1982 – twin-dotted macrochilo moth
 Macrochilo iteinalis (Viette, 1956)
 Macrochilo larymna (H. Druce, 1891)
 Macrochilo litophora Grote, 1873 – brown-lined owlet moth
 Macrochilo louisiana Forbes, 1922 – Louisiana macrochilo moth
 Macrochilo orciferalis Walker, 1859 – bronzy macrochilo moth
 Macrochilo santerivalis Ferguson, 1982

References

Herminiinae
Moth genera